is an area in the eastern portion of Shinjuku, Tokyo, Japan.

Places in Ichigaya
Hosei University Ichigaya Campus
Chuo University Graduate School
Ministry of Defense headquarters: Formerly GHQ of the Imperial Japanese Army; following World War II, the building became the headquarters for the Japan Ground Self-Defense Force Eastern Army. Mishima Yukio committed suicide here in 1970. It became Defense Agency headquarters in May 2000 when the previous headquarters in Akasaka were closed to make way for Tokyo Midtown. In 2007 the organization became a ministry. The Memorial Zone for JSDF personnel is located to the east of the Defense Ministry headquarters.
Japanese Go Association

Companies based in Ichigaya

Borland Japan
Dai Nippon Printing
Informatica Corporation Japan
Nakano Corporation
Team Ninja

Metro stations
Akebonobashi Station (Toei Shinjuku Line)
Ichigaya Station (JR Chūō Local Line, Namboku Line, Toei Shinjuku Line, Yūrakuchō Line) - The JR and Toei platforms are located across the river in Chiyoda.
Ushigome-yanagichō Station (Toei Ōedo Line)

Neighborhoods of Tokyo
Shinjuku